Potanipo Hill is a  peak located in the town of Brookline in southern New Hampshire, United States.

The hill became home to one of the first lift-served ski areas in New England when Brookline Ski Area opened on its eastern face. The area later grew to become a larger regional operation known as Big Bear and later Musket Mountain. The ski area closed in 1984.

Paul Andres purchased a large tract of land on the mountain, including most of the former ski area, and began developing a large art facility.  Now open to the public, Andres Institute of Art features dozens of works designed by artists from around the world.

See also
Potanipo Pond

References

External links
 Andres Institute of Art
 Brookline/Big Bear/Musket Mtn. Ski Area - New England Lost Ski Areas Project

Mountains of Hillsborough County, New Hampshire
Mountains of New Hampshire
Defunct ski areas and resorts in New Hampshire
Brookline, New Hampshire